Royal Challengers Bangalore (RCB) is a franchise cricket team based in Bangalore, India, which plays in the Indian Premier League (IPL). They were one of the eight teams which competed in the 2016 Indian Premier League. They were captained by Virat Kohli and coached by Daniel Vettori.

Background
In March 2016, the team director Vijay Mallya stepped down from his position, but chose to remain with the franchise in the role of chief mentor.

The Royal Challengers wore separate kits for home and away matches for the first time during the 2016 season.

Season standings

Fixtures

References

Royal Challengers Bangalore seasons
2010s in Bangalore
2016 Indian Premier League